The 2009 Paraguayan Primera División season (officially the 2009 Copa TIGO for sponsorship reasons) is the 75th season of top-flight professional football in Paraguay. It is the second season in which a champion will be crowned for each tournament.

Teams

Torneo Apertura 
The Campeonato de Apertura, also the Torneo TIGO Apertura for sponsorship reasons, is the first championship of the season. It began on February 14 and ended on July 5. The championship is officially called the Centenario del Club Sol de América to commemorate the 100th anniversary of the foundation of Club Sol de América.

Torneo Clausura 
The Campeonato de Clausura, also the Torneo Tigo Clausura for sponsorship reasons, is the second championship of the season. It began on July 25 and end on December 13. The championship is officially called the Campeones de América – 1953 to commemorate the Paraguayan national team's 1953 South American Championship title.

International qualification 
The two tournament champions earn the Paraguay 1 and Paraguay 2 berths in the Second Stage of the 2010 Copa Libertadores. All remaining international qualification will be determined through a season-wide aggregate table. The Paraguay 3 in the 2010 Copa Libertadores berth goes to the best-placed non-champion. For the 2010 Copa Sudamericana, the Paraguay 1 berth goes to the highest placed champion. Paraguay 2 and Paraguay 3 will go to the highest placed teams who have not qualified to an international tournament.

Relegation 
Relegations is determined at the end of the season by computing an average of the number of points earned per game over the past three seasons. The team with the lowest average is relegated to the División Intermedia for the following season. The next lowest team plays a relegation/promotion playoff match against the 2009 División Intermedia runner-up.

Updated as of December 13, 2009.Source: APF

Relegation/promotion playoff 
The relegation/promotion playoff was contested over two legs. The team who earned the most points over two legs was promoted— or remained —in the Primera División. Should there be a tie in points, goal difference was taken into account, followed a penalty shootout if needed. Sport Colombia played at home during the second leg.

See also 
2009 in Paraguayan football
List of transfers of the Primera División Paraguaya 2009

External links 
APF's official website 
Season rules 
2009 season on RSSSF

Paraguay
Paraguayan Primera División seasons
1